Kilby House, at 1301 Woodstock Ave. in Anniston, Alabama, was built in 1914.  It was listed on the National Register of Historic Places in 1985.

It is a large two-and-a-half-story Georgian Revival-style house with a hipped roof.  It "is distinguished by its symmetrical massing and elaborate moldings. The five-bay central block, flanked by recessed three-bay wings, is centered by a segmentally curved pedimented portico with two fluted Doric columns and a fluted pilaster on each side."  It was designed by architects Warren-Knight and Davis, Inc., of Birmingham.

It was deemed significant for its association with Thomas E. Kilby, who served as Lieutenant Governor of Alabama from 1914 to 1918 and as Governor from 1919 through 1923, and architecturally "as retaining perhaps the finest Georgian Revival facade remaining in Anniston."

It is also a contributing building in the East Anniston Residential Historic District.

References

National Register of Historic Places in Calhoun County, Alabama
Georgian Revival architecture in Alabama
Residential buildings completed in 1914